is a Japanese alpine skier. He competed in the 1976 Winter Olympics and the 1980 Winter Olympics.

References

1955 births
Living people
Japanese male alpine skiers
Olympic alpine skiers of Japan
Alpine skiers at the 1976 Winter Olympics
Alpine skiers at the 1980 Winter Olympics
Sportspeople from Nagano Prefecture
20th-century Japanese people